Rufat Asadovich Riskiyev (born October 2, 1949 in Akkurgan, Uzbek SSR) is a retired boxer, who represented the USSR at the 1976 Summer Olympics in Montreal, Quebec, Canada. There he won the silver medal in the middleweight division (– 75 kg). In the final he was defeated by United States youngster Michael Spinks, after the referee had to stop the contest in the third round.

Two years earlier, at the inaugural 1974 World Championships in Havana, Cuba, Riskiyev won the world title. He trained at the Dynamo sports society.

1976 Olympic results 
Below is the record of Rufat Riskiyev, a middleweight boxer from the Soviet Union who competed at the 1976 Montreal Olympics:

Round of 32: Defeated Jorma Taipale (Finland) KO 3
Round of 16: Defeated Ilya Dimitrov (Bulgaria) by decision, 5-0
Quarterfinal: Defeated Siraj-ud-Din (Pakistan) RSC 3
Semifinal: Defeated Luis Martínez (Cuba) by decision, 3-2
Final: Lost to Michael Spinks (United States) RSC 3 (was awarded silver medal)

References
 databaseOlympics

1949 births
Living people
Uzbeks
Soviet male boxers
Middleweight boxers
Boxers at the 1976 Summer Olympics
Olympic boxers of the Soviet Union
Olympic silver medalists for the Soviet Union
People from Tashkent Region
Olympic medalists in boxing
Uzbekistani male boxers
Honoured Masters of Sport of the USSR
AIBA World Boxing Championships medalists
Medalists at the 1976 Summer Olympics